Luo Ergang (January 29, 1901 – May 25, 1997), also known as Elgan Lo and Lo Erh-kang, was a historian and researcher at the Institute of Modern History of Chinese Academy of Social Sciences (中国社会科学院近代史研究所). He was an authority on the Taiping Rebellion from a left-wing perspective.

Biography
Born in Gui County (now Guigang, Guangxi) on January 29, 1901, Luo studied history under Professor Hu Shih at Peking University.

In December 1950, Luo Ergang began to prepare for the construction of the Taiping Heavenly Kingdom Memorial Hall (太平天国纪念馆), which was established in October 1956 (later renamed as the Taiping Heavenly Kingdom History Museum).

In 1958, he joined the Chinese Communist Party. 
        
He died of illness in Beijing on May 25, 1997.

Works

References

1901 births
1997 deaths
Historians of China
People from Guigang
People's Republic of China historians
Historians from Guangxi
20th-century Chinese historians
Chinese Academy of Social Sciences